The small mouse-tailed bat (Rhinopoma muscatellum) is a species of bat in the Rhinopomatidae family. It is found in Afghanistan, Iran, Oman, and possibly Ethiopia, ranging from the Sistan Basin in Iran well into the Helmand River basin of south-western Afghanistan.

Their diet conists of flying insects which they eat whilst flying. 

This species was demonstrated as distinct from R. hardwickei based on mutually exclusive morphological features; the small mouse-tailed bat has a nearly unridged skull with small teeth and large cavities filled with fluid.

References

Rhinopomatidae
Mammals of Afghanistan
Mammals described in 1903
Taxonomy articles created by Polbot
Taxa named by Oldfield Thomas
Bats of Asia